Corinne Rey may refer to:

Corinne Rey (cartoonist), French cartoonist at Charlie Hebdo known as Coco
Corinne Rey-Bellet (1972–2006), Swiss alpine skier